The Chelsea Handler Show is an American sketch comedy series that aired on the E! television network. The series starred Chelsea Handler and featured skits that mocked the entertainment industry, spoofed celebrities, television, the elderly, and herself. The show aired Friday nights at 10:30 EST.

Synopsis
The mini-series was green lighted by E! in early 2006 and premiered on April 21, 2006.  The cable channel ordered eight episodes of the half-hour project that features Handler, a Tonight Show correspondent and star of Oxygen's Girls Behaving Badly, in taped spoofs, film shorts and field remote pieces, all framed by stand-up segments of her performing before a studio audience.

Episodes 
The show originally ordered eight episodes which aired from April 21 to June 9 and was given an additional four episodes starting August 11 to create a 12-episode season. The show finished its run on September 8, 2006.

Successors and spin-offs
Chelsea Handler began hosting the late-night comedy show, Chelsea Lately on July 16, 2007, also on E!.

External links 
 

2006 American television series debuts
2006 American television series endings
2000s American sketch comedy television series
E! original programming
English-language television shows
Television series by 3 Arts Entertainment